Hamtai (also called Hamday or Kapau) is the most populous of the Angan languages of Papua New Guinea. It is also known as Kamea, Kapau, and Watut. Dialects are Wenta, Howi, Pmasa’a, Hamtai proper, and Kaintiba. The language was unwritten until 2009.

Phonology
In Hamtai, there are 14 consonants, 7 vowels, and two tones (rising and falling).

Vowels

Consonants

References

Languages of Gulf Province
Languages of Morobe Province
Angan languages